Sobiesław, Soběslav or Sebeslav (Proto-Slavic: *Sobęslavь, Polish: Sobiesław, Czech: Soběslav, Slovak: Sebeslav, Old Church Slavonic: Собѧславь) is a very old Slavic given name, mostly common among the West Slavs. Because of folk etymology, it is popularly supposed to derive from sobie ("usurp, for me, myself") and sław ("glory, prestige"); however, it is actually derived from a Proto-Indo-European name meaning "wise-famous", cognate with Sophocles (roots *sap and *ḱléwos). The feminine form is Sobiesława/Soběslava/Собѧслава.

People with the name
 Soběslav (d. 1004), a brother of Saint Adalbert of Prague
 Soběslav I, Duke of Bohemia
 Sobieslaw I, Duke of Pomerania
 Soběslav II, Duke of Bohemia
 Sobiesław Zasada, a Polish former rally driver
 Soběslav Pinkas, a 19th-century Czech painter

See also
 Samborides, a Pomeranian dynasty

References

Slavic masculine given names
Belarusian masculine given names
Czech masculine given names
Slovene masculine given names
Polish masculine given names
Ukrainian masculine given names